Ibad Amiravich Akhmedov (born 18 January 1975) is a Belarusian wrestler. He competed in the men's Greco-Roman 52 kg at the 1996 Summer Olympics.

References

External links
 

1975 births
Living people
Belarusian male sport wrestlers
Olympic wrestlers of Belarus
Wrestlers at the 1996 Summer Olympics
People from Şirvan, Azerbaijan
20th-century Belarusian people
21st-century Belarusian people